Canteen is an English-language literary and arts magazine published twice a year. Founded in 2007 by publisher Stephen Pierson, editor-in-chief Sean Finney, executive editor Mia Lipman, and former art director Sai Sriskandarajah, the magazine asks its contributors to reveal their creative process to the reader. As described by Finney, "Canteen is the literary magazine that comes with instructions." "Canteen was born at the restaurant of the same name in San Francisco, where chef Dennis Leary hosted literary salons."  The magazine has offices in Brooklyn, NY, and San Francisco, CA.

Content
Canteen consists of photos, essays, fiction, nonfiction, poetry, and paintings by both well-known and amateur writers and artists. In addition to input from published authors and celebrated artists, the magazine accepts submissions of written and visual work from readers through their website.  Issue five of Canteen was named "Book of the Week" by the arts blog Large Hearted Boy and WORD Bookstore in Brooklyn for skillfully combining word and image.

Anatomy of a Photo Contest
In 2010, Canteen held a photo contest that was designed to reveal the decision-making processes behind such competitions, which are sometimes criticized for their opaque nature. The magazine published the comments and critiques of the contest's judges in full, as well as the response of one of the critiqued artists. The competition was judged by Brooklyn Museum director Arnold Lehman and photographer Matthew Porter. Winning entries, along with other images selected from the contest's submissions, were presented in a show at the powerHouse Arena in DUMBO, Brooklyn in August 2010.

canTeens (tutoring program)
In September 2008, Canteen launched a literacy tutoring program for middle school students in Harlem, NY.  The workshops are designed to increase the students' confidence in their work, as well as encouraging them to continue writing and to share it with others.  Workshops have been taught by contributing Canteen authors such as Porochista Khakpour, Gina Gionfriddo and Garth Risk Hallberg, and other authors such as Lorraine Adams and Amy Braunschweiger. At the end of each semester, the students' work is compiled into a professionally designed and printed magazine that is nationally distributed.

Outwrite
Outwrite is a flash-fiction writing contest created by Canteen that pits an established writer against literary novices who have never been published, deciding the winner based on audience response.  In the inaugural contest in Los Angeles on April 12, 2010, Dana Goodyear (poet and New Yorker staff writer) competed against unknowns Bradley Spinelli and A. Wolfe.  Wolfe's piece garnered the best audience reaction and took home the grand prize. Canteen is planning more Outwrite events to be held in New York, Boston, Philadelphia, Madison, Washington D.C., and San Francisco.

Notable Contributors
Matthew Porter (photographer)
Tao Lin (author)
Dana Goodyear (poet)
Benjamin Kunkel (author)
Joyce Maynard (author)
Nathaniel Rich (author)
Stephen Elliott (author)
Ben Fountain (author)
Porochista Khakpour (author)
Po Bronson (author)
Stephen Shore (photographer)

Distribution
Canteen achieved national distribution through Disticor with its first issue in 2007. It is sold at most Barnes and Noble locations in the U.S. and Canada, as well as at independent bookstores around the country.

References

External links
Canteen magazine official site
Canteen magazine in the San Francisco Chronicle
Canteen Confidential in BlackBook magazine
Modernism West at Foreign Cinema: Canteen magazine launch party on ArtBusiness.com
Review of Canteen magazine, issue 4, from Newpages.com
Black Friday Shopping That's Good for the Soul on BrooklynBased.net

Canteen magazine
Biannual magazines published in the United States
Magazines established in 2007
Magazines published in San Francisco
Magazines published in New York City
Visual arts magazines published in the United States
2007 establishments in California